Alireza Rafieipour (born 9 October 1993) is an Iranian professional futsal player. He is currently a member of Crop in the Iranian Futsal Super League.

Honours

International 
 AFC Futsal Championship
 Champion (1): 2018
 Runner-up (1): 2022

References

1993 births
Living people
People from Behbahan
Iranian men's futsal players
Futsal defenders
Melli Haffari FSC players
Iranian expatriate futsal players
Iranian expatriate sportspeople in Iraq
Iranian expatriate sportspeople in Vietnam
Iranian expatriate sportspeople in Indonesia
Sportspeople from Khuzestan province
21st-century Iranian people